Johanna Helen Lindsey  (née Howard, March 10, 1952 – October 27, 2019) was an American writer of historical romance novels. All of her books reached the New York Times bestseller list, many reaching No. 1.

Personal life 
Johanna Helen Howard was born on March 10, 1952, in Frankfurt, West Germany. Her mother was Wanda Donaldson Howard, a personnel management specialist. Her father was Edwin Dennis Howard, a soldier in the U.S. Army, stationed in West Germany, where she was born. The Howard family moved about a great deal when she was young due to her father's military career.

Her father always dreamed of retiring to Hawaii, but he died in 1964. That year, her family moved to Hawaii, likely to honor his wish.

In 1970, when she was still in school, she married Ralph Bruce Lindsey, becoming a young housewife. The marriage continued, the couple residing in Hawaii and producing three children; Alfred, Joseph and Garret, who have made her a grandmother. After her husband's death, Lindsey moved to Maine and did not remarry.

Writing career 
Lindsey wrote her first book, Captive Bride, in 1977 "on a whim". The book was a success, as have been the forty-nine novels that followed. As of 2006 more than fifty-eight million copies of her books had been sold worldwide, and her work has been translated into twelve languages.

Style
Owing to their diversity of settings Lindsey's work covers a number of romance subgenres, including historical fiction (medieval, Regency, American frontier, and Viking eras) and science fiction. Her most popular books are a series of Regency sagas about the fictional Malory family (see Family Tree).

Richard Sandomir of The New York Times explained,Lindsey set her passionate tales in many locales, including the Caribbean; the Barbary Coast; England as early as the year 873; Norway, when the Vikings ruled; 19th-century Texas, Wyoming and Montana; and the planet Kystran, in a series of science-fiction bodice-rippers.

Bibliography

By Reading Order

Viking Haardrad Family Saga Series
 Fires of Winter (1980)
 Hearts Aflame (1987)
 Surrender My Love (1994)

Southern Series
 Glorious Angel (1982)
 Heart of Thunder (1983)

Deep space/ Ly-san-ter Family Saga
 Warrior's Woman (1990)
 Keeper Of The Heart (1993)
 Heart Of A Warrior (2001) (Deep space - Earth)

Wyoming westerns series
 Brave the Wild Wind (1984)
 Savage Thunder (1989)
 Angel (1992)

Malory-Anderson Family Saga Series
 Love Only Once (1985) (Regina Ashton/Nicholas Eden)
 Tender Rebel (1988) (Anthony Malory/Roslynn Chadwick) 
 Gentle Rogue (1990) (James Malory/Georgina Anderson)
 The Magic of You (1993) (Amy Malory/Warren Anderson)
 Say You Love Me (1996) (Derek Malory/Kelsey Langton) 
 The Present (1998) (Christopher Malory/Anastasia Stephanoff)
 A Loving Scoundrel (2004) (Jeremy Malory/Danette "Danny" Hilary)
 Captive of My Desires (2006) (Drew Anderson/Gabrielle Brooks)
 No Choice But Seduction (2008) (Boyd Anderson/Katey Tyler)
 That Perfect Someone (2010) (Richard Allen/Julia Miller)
 Stormy Persuasion (2014) (Judith Malory/Nathan Tremayne)
 Beautiful Tempest (2017) (Jacqueline Malory/Damon Reeves)

Straton Family Saga Series
 A Heart So Wild (1986)
 All I Need Is You (1997)

Medieval (Shefford's Knights) Series
 Defy Not the Heart (1989)
 Joining (1999)

Cardinia's Royal Family
 Once a Princess (1991)
 You Belong to Me (1994)

Sherring Cross Series
 Man of My Dreams (1992)
 Love Me Forever (1995)
 The Pursuit (2002)

Locke Family Series
 The Heir (2000) (Duncan MacTavish and Sabrina Lambert)
 The Devil Who Tamed Her (2007) (Raphael Locke and Ophelia Reid)
 A Rogue of My Own (2009) (Rupert St. John and Rebecca Marshall)
  Let Love Find You (2012) (Devin Baldwin and Amanda Locke)

Montana Series
 One Heart to Win (2013) (Tiffany Warren & Hunter Callahan)
 Wildfire in His Arms (2015) (Maxine & Degan Grant)
 Marry Me by Sundown (2018) (Violet Mitchell & Morgan Callahan)

Single novels
 Captive Bride (1977)
 A Pirate's Love (1978)
 Paradise Wild (1981)
 So Speaks the Heart (1983)
 A Gentle Feuding (1984)
 Tender Is the Storm (1985)
 When Love Awaits (1986)
 Secret Fire (1987)
 Silver Angel (1988)
 Prisoner of My Desire (1991)
 Until Forever (1995)
 Home for the Holidays (2000)
 A Man to Call My Own (2003)
 Marriage Most Scandalous (2006)
 When Passion Rules (2011)
 Make Me Love You (2016)
 Temptation's Darling (2019)

By Setting

Middle Ages
Medieval Vikings
 Fires of Winter (1980)
 Hearts Aflame (1987)
 Surrender My Love (1994)

Medieval England
 So Speaks the Heart (1983)
 A Gentle Feuding (1984)
 When Love Awaits (1986)
 Defy Not the Heart (1989)
 Prisoner of My Desire (1991)
 Joining (1999)

Early Modern Times
Arabian Dunes
 Captive Bride (1977)
 Silver Angel (1988)

Caribbean
 A Pirate's Love (1978)

Modern Times

Regency England 
 Love Only Once (1985)
 Tender Rebel (1988)
 Gentle Rogue (1990)
 The Magic Of You (1993)
 Say You Love Me (1996)
 The Present (1998)
 A Loving Scoundrel (2004)
 Captive of My Desires (2006)
 No Choice But Seduction (2008)
 Stormy Persuasion (2014)
 Make Me Love You (2016)

Regency England & Scotland

 Man of My Dreams (1992)
 Love Me Forever (1995)
 Home for the Holidays (2000)
 The Heir (2000)
 The Pursuit (2002)
 Marriage Most Scandalous (2006)
 The Devil Who Tamed Her (2007)
 A Rogue of My Own (2009)
 Let Love Find You (2012)
 Temptation's Darling (2019)

Eastern Europe
 Secret Fire (1987) (London --> Russia)
 Once a Princess (1991) (U.S. --> Cardinia)
 You Belong to Me (1994) (Russia --> Cardinia)
 When Passion Rules (2011) (London --> Lubinia)

America in 19th century
 Paradise Wild (1981) (Boston --> Hawaii)
 Glorious Angel (1982) (Texas)
 Heart of Thunder (1983) (Wild West)
 Brave the Wild Wind (1984) (Wyoming)
 Tender Is the Storm (1985) (Wild West)
 A Heart So Wild (1986) (Texas)
 Savage Thunder (1989) (Wyoming)
 Angel (1992) (Wild West)
 All I Need Is You (1997) (Wild West)
 A Man to Call My Own (2003) (Wild West)
 One Heart to Win (2013) (Wild West) (50th novel by Johanna Lindsey)
 Wildfire in His Arms (2015) (Wild West)
 Marry Me by Sundown (2018) (Wild West)

Paranormal Fantasy
Deep space/ Ly-san-ter Family Saga
 Warrior's Woman (1990)
 Keeper Of The Heart (1993)
 Heart Of A Warrior (2001) (Deep space --> Earth)

Time Travel
 Until Forever (1995) (Now --> Middle Ages)

 Legacy 

The covers of Lindsey's novels have been parodied, fitting in as they do with a trend in romance publishing to use gaudy painted designs that feature a muscular male model with his chest exposed, towering above or otherwise dominating floridly dressed women.

In December 2019, her son Alfred announced that Lindsey died on October 27, 2019, at the age of 67. The cause of death was Stage 4 lung cancer.
Italian model Fabio was often featured on the cover of Lindsey's work. In 1987, Fabio first appeared on Lindsey's novel Hearts Aflame'', painted by Elaine Duillo. This has been credited with launching Fabio's career as a male model. By 1992, over 55,000,000 romance novels featuring Fabio were sold. Fabio expressed his condolences in 2019 upon hearing of Lindsey's death:I loved being featured on her covers. To this day, Man of My Dreams is still one of my all time favorites. Rest in peace, Johanna. Thank you for sharing your gift. You will be missed.

References

External links
 Johanna Lindsey's Official Website 
 Johanna Lindsey's Webpage in Fantastic Fiction's Website
 Johanna Lindsey bio and title list

1952 births
2019 deaths
American romantic fiction writers
20th-century American novelists
21st-century American novelists
20th-century American women writers
21st-century American women writers
Women romantic fiction writers
American women novelists